Lavey are a Gaelic football club from County Cavan in Ireland. They are affiliated with Cavan GAA. The parish of Lavey (formerly also transcribed as "Lavay" or "Lowey"; from the Gaelic "Leamhach", a place producing elm trees") is in the barony of Upper Loughtee, County Cavan, between Stradone and Ballyjamesduff, near Virginia.

History
Lavey won the Cavan Junior Football Championship for the very first time in 1950, but the final wasn't played until 1951. Later the same year, the club won the Cavan Senior Football Championship for the only time in the club's history.

The club won the Cavan Intermediate Football Championship for the first time in 2009, beating Cootehill in the final. Their year didn't end there, and wins over Kinawley in the quarter-final and Fanad Gaels in the semi-final sent Lavey into the final of the Ulster Intermediate Club Football Championship. Lavey lost the final by two points to Cookstown Fr. Rock's.

Honours
 Cavan Senior Football Championship: 1
 1951
 Cavan Intermediate Football Championship: 1
 2009
 Cavan Junior Football Championship: 3
 1950, 1975, 2003
 Cavan Under-21 Football Championship: 2
 2011*, 2013* (*Assan Gaels (Lavey/Killinkere/Cuchulainns))
 Cavan Minor Football Championship: 4
 1974*, 1976*, 1977*, 2012** (*Lavey/Laragh United) (**Lavey/Castlerahan)

References

External links
Official Cavan GAA Website
Cavan Club GAA

1980 establishments in Ireland
Gaelic games clubs in County Cavan
Gaelic football clubs in County Cavan